Tomognathus was a halecomorph fish related to the modern bowfin that lived in the Cretaceous Period.  It was named by Dixon in 1850.

The name Tomognathus was also later applied to a modern species of ant by Mayr in 1861. But since the name was already taken it came instead to be classified as Harpagoxenus.

References

Amiiformes
Cretaceous fish